Operculina is a genus of plants in the morning-glory family which that are found throughout the world.

Species
The following species are recognised in the genus Operculina:

Operculina aequisepala (Domin) R. W. Johnson
Operculina brownii Ooststr.
Operculina codonantha (Benth.) Hallier f.
Operculina hamiltonii  (G. Don) D. F. Austin & Staples
Operculina leptoptera Urb.
Operculina macrocarpa (L.) Urb.
Operculina maypurensis (Hallier f.) A.R.Simões & Staples
Operculina petaloidea (Choisy) Ooststr.
Operculina pinnatifida (Kunth) O'Donell 
Operculina polynesica Staples
Operculina pteripes (G. Don) O'Donell
Operculina riedeliana (Oliv.) Ooststr.
Operculina sericantha (Miq.) Ooststr.
Operculina tansaensis Santapau & Patel
Operculina turpethum Silva Manso (Indian Jalap)
Operculina ventricosa (Bertero) Peter

References

External links

Convolvulaceae
Convolvulaceae genera